Henry Fielding (22 April 1707 – 8 October 1754) was an English novelist, irony writer, and dramatist known for earthy humour and satire. His comic novel Tom Jones is still widely appreciated. He and Samuel Richardson are seen as founders of the traditional English novel. He also holds a place in the history of law enforcement, having used his authority as a magistrate to found the Bow Street Runners, London's first intermittently funded, full-time police force.

Early life
Fielding was born 22 April 1707 at Sharpham, Somerset, and educated at Eton College, where he began a lifelong friendship with William Pitt the Elder. His mother died when he was 11. A suit for custody was brought by his grandmother against his charming but irresponsible father, Lt Gen. Edmund Fielding. The settlement placed Henry in his grandmother's care, but he continued to see his father in London.

In 1725, Henry tried to abduct his cousin Sarah Andrews (with whom he was infatuated) while she was on her way to church. He fled to avoid prosecution.

In 1728, Fielding travelled to Leiden to study classics and law at the university. However, penury forced him back to London, where he began writing for the theatre. Some of his work savagely criticised the government of Prime Minister Sir Robert Walpole.

Dramatist and novelist
According to George R. Levine, Henry Fielding, in his first writings used two forms of "rhetorical poses" that were popular during the eighteenth century. Henry Fielding would construct "the non-ironic pseudonym such as Addison Steele used in the Spectator, and the ironic mask or Persona, such as Swift used in A Modest Proposal." The Theatrical Licensing Act of 1737 is said to be a direct response to his activities in writing for the theatre. Although the play that triggered the act was the unproduced, anonymously authored The Golden Rump, Fielding's dramatic satires had set the tone. Once it was passed, political satire on stage became all but impossible. Fielding retired from the theatre and resumed his legal career to support his wife Charlotte Craddock and two children by becoming a barrister, joining the Middle Temple in 1737 and being called to the bar there in 1740.

Fielding's lack of financial acumen meant the family often endured periods of poverty, but were helped by Ralph Allen, a wealthy benefactor, on whom Squire Allworthy in Tom Jones would be based. Allen went on to provide for the education and support of Fielding's children after the writer's death.

Fielding never stopped writing political satire and satires of current arts and letters. The Tragedy of Tragedies (for which Hogarth designed the frontispiece) was, for example, quite successful as a printed play. Based on his earlier Tom Thumb, this was another of Fielding's irregular plays published under the name of H. Scriblerus Secundus, a pseudonym intended to link himself ideally with the Scriblerus Club of literary satirists founded by Jonathan Swift, Alexander Pope and John Gay. He also contributed several works to journals.

From 1734 to 1739, Fielding wrote anonymously for the leading Tory periodical, The Craftsman, against the Prime Minister, Sir Robert Walpole. His patron was the opposition Whig MP George Lyttelton, a boyhood friend from Eton to whom he later dedicated Tom Jones. Lyttelton followed his leader Lord Cobham in forming a Whig opposition to Walpole's government called the Cobhamites, which included another of Fielding's Eton friends, William Pitt. In The Craftsman, Fielding voiced an opposition attack on bribery and corruption in British politics. Despite writing for the opposition to Walpole, which included Tories as well as Whigs, Fielding was "unshakably a Whig" and often praised Whig heroes such as the Duke of Marlborough and Gilbert Burnet.

Fielding dedicated his play Don Quixote in England to the opposition Whig leader Lord Chesterfield. It appeared on 17 April 1734, the same day writs were issued for the general election. He dedicated his 1735 play The Universal Gallant to Charles Spencer, 3rd Duke of Marlborough, a political follower of Chesterfield. The other prominent opposition paper, Common Sense, founded by Chesterfield and Lyttelton, was named after a character in Fielding's Pasquin (1736). Fielding wrote at least two articles for it in 1737 and 1738.

Fielding continued to air political views in satirical articles and newspapers in the late 1730s and early 1740s. He was the main writer and editor from 1739 to 1740 for the satirical paper The Champion, which was sharply critical of Walpole's government and of pro-government literary and political writers. He sought to evade libel charges by making its political attacks so funny or embarrassing to the victim that a publicized court case would seem even worse. He later became chief writer for the Whig government of Henry Pelham.

Fielding took to novel writing in 1741, angered by Samuel Richardson's success with Pamela. His first success was an anonymous parody of that novel, called Shamela. This follows the model of Tory satirists of the previous generation, notably Swift and Gay.

Fielding followed this with Joseph Andrews (1742), an original work supposedly dealing with Pamela's brother, Joseph. His purpose, however, was more than parody, for as stated in the preface, he intended a "kind of writing which I do not remember to have seen hitherto attempted in our language." In what Fielding called a "comic epic poem in prouse", he blended two classical traditions: that of the epic, which had been poetic, and that of the drama, but emphasizing the comic rather than the tragic. Another distinction of Joseph Andrews and the novels to come was use of everyday reality of character and action, as opposed to the fables of the past. While begun as a parody, it developed into an accomplished novel in its own right and is seen as Fielding's debut as a serious novelist. In 1743, he published a novel in the Miscellanies volume III (which was the first volume of the Miscellanies): The Life and Death of Jonathan Wild, the Great, which is sometimes counted as his first, as he almost certainly began it before he wrote Shamela and Joseph Andrews. It is a satire of Walpole equating him and Jonathan Wild, the gang leader and highwayman. He implicitly compares the Whig party in Parliament with a gang of thieves run by Walpole, whose constant desire to be a "Great Man" (a common epithet with Walpole) ought to culminate in the antithesis of greatness: hanging.

Fielding's anonymous The Female Husband (1746) fictionalizes a case in which a female transvestite was tried for duping another woman into marriage; this was one of several small pamphlets costing sixpence. Though a minor piece in his life's work, it reflects his preoccupation with fraud, shamming and masks.

His greatest work is The History of Tom Jones, a Foundling (1749), a meticulous comic novel with elements of the picaresque and the Bildungsroman, telling a convoluted, hilarious tale of how a foundling came into a fortune. The plot is too ingenious for a simple summary; it tells of Tom's alienation from his foster father, Squire Allworthy, and his sweetheart, Sophia Western, and his reconciliation with them after lively and dangerous adventures on the road and in London. It triumphs as a presentation of English life and character in the mid-18th century. Every social type is represented and through them every shade of moral behaviour. Fielding's varied style tempers the basic seriousness of the novel and his authorial comment before each chapter adds a dimension to a conventional, straightforward narrative.

Sister
Fielding's younger sister, Sarah, also became a successful writer. Her novel The Governess, or The Little Female Academy (1749) is thought to be the first in English aimed expressly at children.

Marriages
Fielding married Charlotte Craddock in 1734 at the Church of St Mary in Charlcombe, Somerset. She died in 1744, and he later modelled the heroines of Tom Jones and of Amelia on her. They had five children; their only daughter Henrietta died at the age of 23, having already been "in deep decline" when she married a military engineer, James Gabriel Montresor, some months before. Three years after Charlotte's death, Fielding disregarded public opinion by marrying her former maid Mary Daniel, who was pregnant. Mary bore five children: three daughters who died young, and two sons, William and Allen.

Jurist and magistrate

Despite the scandal, Fielding's consistent anti-Jacobitism and support for the Church of England led to his appointment a year later as London's chief magistrate, while his literary career went from strength to strength. Most of his work concerned London's criminal population of thieves, informers, gamblers and prostitutes. Though living in a corrupt and callous society, he became noted for impartial judgements, incorruptibility and compassion for those whom social inequities led into crime. The income from his office ("the dirtiest money upon earth") dwindled as he refused to take money from the very poor. Joined by his younger half-brother John, he helped found what some call London's first police force, the Bow Street Runners, in 1749.

According to the historian G. M. Trevelyan, the Fieldings were two of the best magistrates in 18th-century London, who did much to enhance judicial reform and improve prison conditions. Fielding's influential pamphlets and enquiries included a proposal for abolishing public hangings. This did not, however, imply opposition to capital punishment as such – as is evident, for example, in his presiding in 1751 over the trial of the notorious criminal James Field, finding him guilty in a robbery and sentencing him to hang. John Fielding, despite being blind by then, succeeded his older brother as chief magistrate, becoming known as the "Blind Beak of Bow Street" for his ability to recognise criminals by their voices alone.

In January 1752 Fielding started a fortnightly, The Covent-Garden Journal, published under the pseudonym "Sir Alexander Drawcansir, Knt., Censor of Great Britain" until November of that year. Here Fielding challenged the "armies of Grub Street" and periodical writers of the day in a conflict that became the Paper War of 1752–1753.

Fielding then published Examples of the Interposition of Providence in the Detection and Punishment of Murder (1752), a treatise rejecting deistic and materialistic visions of the world in favour of belief in God's presence and divine judgement, arguing that the murder rate was rising due to neglect of the Christian religion. In 1753 he wrote Proposals for Making an Effectual Provision for the Poor.

Fielding's humanitarian commitment to justice in the 1750s (for instance in support of Elizabeth Canning) coincided with rapid deterioration in his health. Gout, asthma and cirrhosis of the liver left him on crutches, and with other afflictions sent him to Portugal in 1754 to seek a cure, only to die two months later in Lisbon, reportedly in pain and mental distress. His tomb there is in the British Cemetery (Cemitério Inglês), the graveyard of St. George's Church, Lisbon.

List of works

Novels
Shamela – novella, 1741
The History of the Adventures of Joseph Andrews and his Friend, Mr. Abraham Adams – 1742
The Life and Death of Jonathan Wild, the Great – 1743, ironic treatment of Jonathan Wild, a notorious underworld figure of the time. Published as Volume 3 of Miscellanies
The Female Husband or the Surprising History of Mrs Mary alias Mr George Hamilton, who was convicted of having married a young woman of Wells and lived with her as her husband, taken from her own mouth since her confinement – pamphlet, fictionalized report, 1746
The History of Tom Jones, a Foundling – 1749
A Journey from this World to the Next – 1749
Amelia – 1751

Partial list of poems
The Masquerade – (Fielding's first publication)
Part of Juvenal's Sixth Satire, Modernized in Burlesque Verse

Plays
 Love in Several Masques (1728)
 Rape upon Rape; or, The Justice Caught in his own Trap (1730), also known as The Coffee-House Politician, played in rep with Tom Thumb the Great
 Tom Thumb the Great: A Burlesque Tragedy (1730)
 The Temple Beau (1730)
 The Author's Farce; and The Pleasures of the Town (1730)
 The Letter Writers, or A New Way to Keep a Wife at Home: A Farce (1731), originally an afterpiece to The Tragedy of Tragedies
 The Tragedy of Tragedies: or the Life and Death of Tom Thumb the Great (1731), a revision of Tom Thumb the Great
 The Coffee-House Politician, or The Justice Caught in his own Trap, A Comedy (1730-31), a reworking of Rape upon Rape.  In 1730, another act was added to the play, titled The Battle of the Poets (author unknown).
 The Old Debauchees (1732), originally titled The Despairing Debauchee.  Later revived as The Becauchees; or, The Jesuit Caught
 The Covent-Garden Tragedy (1732), originally appeared in rep with The Old Debauchees, but only played one night.  Eventually revived in rep with Don Quixote in England
 The Mock Doctor: or The Dumb Lady Cur'd (1732), adapted from Molière's  Le Médecin malgré lui, played in rep with The Old Debauchees, as a replacement for The Covent-Garden Tragedy
 The Welsh Opera (1731), originally a companion piece to The Tragedy of Tragedies
 The Grub Street Opera (1731), Fieldings only closet drama, expanded from his play The Welsh Opera
 The Modern Husband (1732)
 The Lottery (1732), played in rep with Joseph Addison's Cato.  A ballad opera with music from "Mr. Seedo."
 The Intriguing Chambermaid (1734), after Jean-François Regnard
 An Old Man Taught Wisdom, or The Virgin Unmasked, A Farce (1734), ballad opera
 Don Quixote in England (1734), ballad opera
 The Miser (1735), incidental music by Thomas Arne, based on the Moliere and Plautus
 The Universal Gallant, or The Different Husbands (1735)
 Pasquin (1736)
 Eurydice, A Farce (1737)
 Eurydice Hiss'd, or A Word to the Wise (1737)
 The Historical Register for the Year 1736 – 1737
 Miss Lucy in Town, ballad farce librettist (1742), composer Thomas Arne, revived in 1770 as The Country Madcap
 Tumbledown Dick or Phaeton in the Suds (1744), ballad opera
 The Wedding-Day. A Comedy. (1743)
 The Fathers (1778), published posthumously with Oliver Goldsmith's The Good-Natur'd Man 
Further Adaptations

 The Opera of Operas; Or, Tom Thumb the Great Alter’d from the Life and Death of Tom Thumb the Great and Set to Musick after the Italian Manner.  As It Is Performing at the New Theatre in the Hay-Market, (1733) written by Eliza Haywood and William Hatchett, music by Thomas Arne, adapted from the Fielding
 Tom Thumb the Great: A Burlesque Tragedy from Fielding (1805-1810), written by Kane O’Hara Esq., adapted from Fielding
 Squire Badger: A burletta in two acts, Thomas Arne composer and librettist (1772), after Henry Fielding's Don Quixote in England (1729).  The work was revived under the name The Sot in 1775.
 The Rival Queens (1794), adapted by William Holcroft from Fielding's The Covent-Garden Tragedy
 Lock Up Your Daughters (1959), musical based on Rape Upon Rape, book by Bernard Miles, lyrics by Lionel Bart, music by Laurie Johnson.  Made into a non-musical film (1969).

Miscellaneous writings
Miscellanies – collection of works, 1743, contained the poem "Part of Juvenal's Sixth Satire, Modernized in Burlesque Verse"
"Examples of the interposition of Providence in the Detection and Punishment of Murder containing above thirty cases in which this dreadful crime has been brought to light in the most extraordinary and miraculous manner; collected from various authors, ancient and modern" (1752)
The Covent-Garden Journal – periodical, 1752
Journal of a Voyage to Lisbon – travel narrative, 1755

References

External links

Famous Quotes by Henry Fielding 

Henry Fielding at the Eighteenth-Century Poetry Archive (ECPA)

1707 births
1754 deaths
18th-century English novelists
18th-century English male writers
English dramatists and playwrights
18th-century English judges
English satirists
English Christians
Henry
People educated at Eton College
People from Glastonbury
Writers from London
English male dramatists and playwrights
English male novelists
Henry Fielding
British parodists
Parody novelists